Semrow is a surname. Notable people with the surname include:

Harry H. Semrow (1915–1987), American politician and baseball team owner
Vanessa Semrow (born 1984), American beauty queen